The Institute of Consolata Missionaries, commonly called the Consolata Missionaries is a Catholic clerical religious congregation of Pontifical Right for men. Its members add the nominal I.M.C. after their names to indicate membership in the Institute.

History  
The Instituto Missioni Consolata was established on 29 January 1901 by the beatified Italian priest Giuseppe Allamano. Its headquarters is in Viale della Mura Aurelie 11-13, Rome, Italy.

Statistics 
In 2018, the congregation had 227 houses, 947 members (737 priests).

Superiors general 
 Bishop Filippo Perlo (1926 – 1929)
 Domenico Fiorina (1949 – 1969)
 Mario Bianchi (1970 - 1981)
 Giuseppe Inverardi (1982 - 1993)
 Pietro Trabucco, I.M.C. (1993 – 2005)
 Aquileo Fiorentini, I.M.C. (2005 – 2011)
 Fr. Stefano Camerlengo, I.M.C. (2011– present)

Prelates from their ranks 
Deceased (by year of death)
 1930: Fr. Giuseppe Balbo, Apostolic Prefect of Meru (Kenya)
 1933: Fr. Gaudenzio Barlassina, Apostolic Prefect of Kaffa (Ethiopia)
 1935: Fr. Francesco Cagliero, Prefect Apostolic of Iringa (Tanzania)
 1944: Bishop Giuseppe Perrachon, Apostolic Vicar emeritus of Nyeri (Kenya)
 1948: Bishop Gabriele Perlo, Apostolic Vicar emeritus of Mogadishu (Somalia)
 1948: Bishop Filippo Perlo, Apostolic Vicar emeritus of Kenya (Kenya) and Superior General emeritus of Consolata Missionaries
 1953: Bishop Luigi Santa, Bishop of Rimini (Italy)
 1960: Bishop Antonio Torasso, Apostolic Vicar of Florencia (Colombia)
 1965: Bishop Attilio Beltramino, Bishop of Iringa (Tanzania)
 1966: Bishop José Nepote-Fus, Bishop-prelate emeritus of Roraima (Brazil)
 1976: Bishop Lawrence Victor Bessone, Bishop of Meru (Kenya)
 1978: Bishop Carlo Re, Bishop emeritus of Ampurias e Tempio (Italy)
 1990: Bishop Carlo Maria Cavallera, Bishop emeritus of Marsabit (Kenya)
 2012: Bishop Angelo Cuniberti, Apostolic Vicar emeritus of Florencia (Colombia)
 2014: Bishop José Luis Serna Alzate, Bishop emeritus of Líbano–Honda (Colombia)
 2014: Bishop Servílio Conti, Bishop-Prelate emeritus of Roraima (Brazil)Alive''
 Cardinal Giorgio Marengo, Apostolic Prefect of Ulaanbataar
 Archbishop Luis Augusto Castro Quiroga, Metropolitan Archbishop of Tunja (Colombia) and President of the Episcopal Conference of Colombia
 Bishop Evaristo Marc Chengula, Bishop of Mbeya (Tanzania)
 Bishop Giovanni Crippa, Bishop of Estância (Brazil)
 Bishop Carillo Gritti, Bishop-Prelate of Itacoatiara (Brazil)
 Bishop Anthony Ireri Mukobo, Apostolic Vicar of Isiolo (Kenya) and Titular Bishop of Rusguniæ
 Bishop Peter Kihara Kariuki, Bishop of Marsabit (Kenya)
 Bishop Francisco Lerma Martínez, Bishop of Gurué (Mozambique)
 Bishop Aldo Mongiano, Bishop emeritus of Roraima (Brazil)
 Bishop Francisco Javier Múnera Correa, Apostolic Vicar of San Vicente del Caguán (Colombia) and Titular Bishop of Aquæ novæ in Numidia
 Bishop Hieronymus Emusugut Joya, Bishop of Maralal (Kenya)
 Bishop Virgilio Pante, Bishop emeritus of Maralal (Kenya)
 Bishop Joaquím Humberto Pinzón Güiza, Apostolic Vicar of Puerto Leguízamo–Solano (Colombia) and Titular Bishop of Otočac
 Bishop José Luís Gerardo Ponce de León, Bishop of Manzini (Swaziland).
 Bishop Elio Rama, Bishop of Pinheiro (Brazil)
 Bishop Ambrogio Ravasi, Bishop emeritus of Marsabit (Kenya)
 Bishop Inácio Saure, Bishop of Tete (Mozambique)
 Bishop Walmir Alberto Valle, Bishop emeritus of Joaçaba (Brazil)
 Fr. Alberto Trevisiol, Rector Magnificus of the Pontifical Urbaniana University

Source and external links 
 I.M.C. website, mainly in Italian
 GigaCatholic, with many biographical links

References

Catholic orders and societies